Zamostea is a commune located in Suceava County, Western Moldavia, northeastern Romania. It is composed of nine villages, namely: Badragi, Ciomârtan, Cojocăreni, Corpaci, Lunca, Nicani, Răuțeni, Tăutești, and Zamostea.

References 

Communes in Suceava County
Localities in Western Moldavia